Brigadier General Frank Wormald, CB (10 February 1868 − 3 October 1915) was a British Army general. He served in the Second Boer War and the First World War where he held the command of the 5th Cavalry Brigade.

History
Wormald was born in Dewsbury Yorkshire 10 February 1868, the son of mill owner John and Annie Wormald. When married he and his wife Gwynifred resided at 10 Walton Place London, adjacent to Harrods. He was a successful big game hunter in India and Africa and became a well known polo player.

He joined the British Army and was commissioned a second lieutenant in the 12th (Prince of Wales's Royal) Lancers on 20 November 1889. He was promoted to lieutenant on 25 March 1891, and to captain on 11 May 1898. He fought in the Second Boer War, and took part in operations in the Orange Free State and Transvaal, including the Battle of Paardeberg and the Relief of Kimberley. For his service in the war he was mentioned in despatches (including the final despatch by Lord Kitchener dated 23 June 1902), received the brevet rank of major on 29 November 1900, and the Queen's South Africa Medal with 5 clasps. Following the end of the war in June 1902, he left Cape Town on the SS Sicilia and returned to Southampton in late July. He was captain of a provisional Regiment of Lancers in late 1902.

In 1912 he was given command of his regiment, serving in the First World War. Serving on the Western Front in France from August 1914. Wounded in his regiments successful charge against the German 1st and 2nd Garde Dragoner on 28 August 1914, he was out of action for three weeks. He was promoted to brigadier-general in July 1915 and given command of the 5th Cavalry Brigade. He was killed on 3 October 1915, while inspecting front line trenches where his brigade were working digging and clearing up battlefield debris. He is buried at Nedonchel Churchyard in France.

References

Bibliography

1868 births
1915 deaths
Burials in France
British Army cavalry generals of World War I
British military personnel of the Second Boer War
12th Royal Lancers officers
British military personnel killed in World War I
Military personnel from Yorkshire
British Army generals